Stephen McDonald (1884 – 1964) was a Scottish footballer who played as a right half, primarily for Falkirk with whom he won the Scottish Cup in 1913. Earlier in his career he had played for Dundee and been on the books at Aston Villa, but never made a first-team appearance for the Birmingham club.

The closest he came to any representative honours was an appearance in a Scottish Football League XI trial in 1910.

References

1884 births
Date of birth missing
1964 deaths
Date of death missing
Footballers from Dundee
Association football wing halves
Scottish footballers
Dundee North End F.C. players
Dundee F.C. players
Brechin City F.C. players
Aston Villa F.C. players
Falkirk F.C. players
Scottish Junior Football Association players
Scottish Football League players